"Tu Hai" is a song sung by A. R. Rahman and Sanah Moidutty from the film Mohenjo Daro. The music of the song was composed by A. R. Rahman while the lyrics were penned by Javed Akhtar. The music video of the track features Hrithik Roshan and Pooja Hegde. The song's lyrical version was released on 10 August 2016, while the video song was released on 6 July 2016 under the music label T-Series. The song was reprised in MTV Unplugged Season 6 and was also rendered by A. R. Rahman.

Development
A. R. Rahman recorded "Tu Hai" which was mixed and mastered by Suresh Permal in Panchathan Record Inn.

Music video 
The music video features Hrithik Roshan and Pooja Hegde dancing for the single.

Release 
The music video was released on 6 July 2016, by T-Series. The lyrical was released on 10 August 2016 and the audio of the song was released on 9 July 2016. The song was made available at iTunes the same day of release and for online streaming at JioSaavn and Gaana on 6 July 2016.

Reception

Audience response 
Upon the release of the full video version of the song, it gained lots of appreciation for its music and choreography. A. R. Rahman, who composed the song received lots of praise for his work for the single.

Critical reviews 
Koimoi on reviewing the music of the soundtrack wrote that "Tu Hai makes up for a soothing hear thanks to the vocals of A R Rahman and Sanah Moidutty. It is a slow-paced song with musical arrangements pulled off quite intelligently. There is a sense of calm that this track provides to its listener and also since the film is a period drama, the lyrics are penned in pure Hindi which is quite unique considering we live in the times of 'Pyaar Ki Maa Ki Puja Karni Hai'. Tu Hai will charm you if you have a penchant for Rahman's slow numbers."

The Times of India stated that "Tu Hai is a classic Rahman number; it is soft, melodious, touches your heart with a simple tune and has the breeziness of a romantic track. Sanah scores in this minimalistic number, which lets the lyrics take center stage. Filmfare wrote that "Tu hai is a meatier, soulful song that grips you from the word go."

India.com, Livemint.com, etc. also reviewed the song.

References

External links

2016 songs
Hindi songs
Hindi film songs
Songs written for films
Songs with music by A. R. Rahman
Songs with lyrics by Javed Akhtar
Indian songs
Pop-folk songs